Seer Green is a village and civil parish in Buckinghamshire, England.

History
The toponym "Seer" is derived from the Norman French for "dry or arid place". In manorial rolls of 1223 it was called La Sere, although local legend has it that the "Seer" refers to King Arthur's Court visiting the area and locals consulting his "seer" – a nice story but of doubtful origin. Even so, there is a pub called Merlin's Cave in the nearby village Chalfont St Giles, after this legend.  The affix "Green" came later.

The Church of England parish church of the Holy Trinity was built in 1846. It is brick and flint with lancet windows. There is also a Baptist church.

Seer Green became a separate parish in 1866, having previously been a hamlet of the parish of Farnham Royal. It had levied a separate poor rate before then.

Until the early part of the 20th century Seer Green was mainly an agricultural village, known for its cherry orchards. The remnants of some of these orchards remain and in honour of this tradition the local school holds a "Cherry Pie Fair" every summer which usually involves a fancy dress parade and a procession through the village.

Amenities
The parish has a Church of England primary school. The village has a Scout troop that is successful in regional competitions. The village youth football club, Seer Green United, has under 7s, under 8s and under 13s teams. The village is close to Hodgemoor Wood, a Site of Special Scientific Interest.

Seer Green and Jordans railway station is on the Chiltern Main Line between Beaconsfield and Gerrards Cross. The station was originally called "Beaconsfield Golf Club", the golf club being next door, but the name was later changed to reflect its position between the two settlements. Bus route 580, provided by Carousel, also runs through the town.

M40 Junction 2 is nearby.

Notable people
Notable residents include:

 Val Doonican, singer
 Frederick Forsyth, author
 Ian McCaskill, weather presenter
 Jon Anderson, musician and lead singer of Yes

Demography

At the 2001 UK census, the Seer Green electoral ward had a population of 2,267. The ethnicity was 98% white, 0.6% mixed race, 0.8% Asian, 0.1% black and 0.5% other. The place of birth of residents was 88.7% United Kingdom, 0.7% Republic of Ireland, 2.6% other Western European countries, and 8% elsewhere. Religion was recorded as 78% Christian, 0.2% Buddhist, 0.3% Hindu, 0% Sikh, 0.7% Jewish, and 0.3% Muslim. 14% were recorded as having no religion, 0.4% had an alternative religion and 6.1% did not state their religion.

The economic activity of residents aged 16–74 was 40.6% in full-time employment, 11.2% in part-time employment, 13.6% self-employed, 1.3% unemployed, 2.2% students with jobs, 3.6% students without jobs, 13.7% retired, 9.9% looking after home or family, 2.1% permanently sick or disabled and 1.8% economically inactive for other reasons. The industry of employment of residents was 14% retail, 10.8% manufacturing, 5.5% construction, 25.7% real estate, 9.3% health and social work, 8% education, 6.3% transport and communications, 3.5% public administration, 2.3% hotels and restaurants, 4.9% finance, 1.1% agriculture and 8.6% other. Compared with national figures, the ward had a relatively high proportion of workers in real estate, and a relatively low proportion in public administration, hotels and restaurants. Of the ward's residents aged 16–74, 36.2% had a higher education qualification or the equivalent, compared with 19.9% nationwide.

References

External links

Vision of Britain

Villages in Buckinghamshire
Civil parishes in Buckinghamshire